The men's 100 metre breaststroke event at the 2008 Summer Olympics took place on 9–11 August at the Beijing National Aquatics Center in Beijing, China.

Japan's Kosuke Kitajima set a new world record of 58.91 to defend his Olympic title in the event. Alexander Dale Oen powered home with a silver in 59.20, earning a first Olympic medal for Norway in swimming. Coming from seventh place in the final turn, France's Hugues Duboscq managed to repeat a bronze from Athens four years earlier, in a time of 59.37. U.S. swimmer and defending silver medalist Brendan Hansen pulled off a fourth-place effort in 59.57, two-tenths of a second (0.20) behind Duboscq.

Australia's Brenton Rickard finished fifth with a time of 59.74, and was followed in sixth spot by Russia's Roman Sloudnov, bronze medalist in Sydney (2000), in a national record of 59.87. Ukraine's Igor Borysik (1:00.20) and American Mark Gangloff (1:00.24) rounded out the finale.

Earlier, Dale Oen set a new Olympic record of 59.41 in the prelims, and eventually lowered it to 59.16 in the semifinals by the next morning's session. He continued to claim the title at the 2011 FINA World Championships, but his life came to a tragic end on April 30, 2012. Shortly after training at altitude in Arizona, Dale Oen was found unconscious in his apartment shower, and died suddenly from a cardiac arrest at Flagstaff Medical Centre.

Controversy
Iran's Mohammad Alirezaei was due to race against Israel's Tom Be'eri in the fourth heat of the 100 metre breaststroke, but pulled out, apparently under the orders from officials of the Iranian delegation. Efraim Zinger, Olympic Committee of Israel General Secretary, criticized the withdrawal saying "Politics takes precedence over sport with the Iranians and the Olympic spirit is as far from them as east is far from west". Giselle Davies, director of communications for the IOC, said that Alirezaei withdrew because of sickness and submitted his case in writing to his Federation. At the 2004 Games in Athens, Iran's Arash Miresmaeili, a two-time world judo champion, refused to compete against Israel's Ehud Vaks in the opening round of the 66 kg competition, later admitting that he made his decision to show solidarity for the Palestinian cause.

Records
Prior to this competition, the existing world and Olympic records were as follows.

The following new world and Olympic records were set during this competition.

Results

Heats

Semifinals

Semifinal 1

Semifinal 2

Final

References

External links
Official Olympic Report

Men's breaststroke 100 metre
Men's events at the 2008 Summer Olympics